The Salisbury Poisonings is a fact-based television drama, starring Anne-Marie Duff, Rafe Spall and Annabel Scholey which portrays the 2018 Novichok poisonings and decontamination crisis in Salisbury, England, and the subsequent Amesbury poisonings. The series was broadcast in three parts on BBC One in June 2020, and has been shown in four parts elsewhere. It was created by Adam Patterson and Declan Lawn for Dancing Ledge Productions.

Synopsis
On 4 March 2018, emergency services receive a call to attend to Sergei and Yulia Skripal who have been found unconscious on a park bench in Salisbury city centre. Medical practitioners are initially puzzled by their illness, and police and the local public health department become involved. A national emergency is precipitated when it is learned that Skripal is a former Russian military intelligence officer who acted as a double agent for the UK's intelligence services during the 1990s and early 2000s. It emerges that he and his daughter were poisoned with a highly potent Novichok agent which was smeared on the front-door handle of their residence. The docudrama also deals with the incidental exposure of several other persons, including a police officer and an uninvolved couple who found a perfume bottle containing the nerve agent which they administered to themselves. At the end of the series, the real-life people involved in the story are pictured returning to the scene, and some film is shown of Dawn Sturgess, the only person to die from their exposure to the Novichok.

Cast
 Anne-Marie Duff as Tracy Daszkiewicz
 William Houston as Ted Daszkiewicz
 Rafe Spall as DS Nick Bailey
 Annabel Scholey as Sarah Bailey
 Darren Boyd as Supt Dave Minty
 Nigel Lindsay as DCC Paul Mills
 Amber Agar as DI Lata Mishra
 Wayne Swann as Sergei Skripal
 Jill Winternitz as Yulia Skripal
 Johnny Harris as Charlie Rowley
 Barry Aird as Matthew Rowley
 MyAnna Buring as Dawn Sturgess
 Stella Gonet as Caroline Sturgess
 Melanie Gutteridge as Claire Sturgess
 Ron Cook as Stan Sturgess
 Mark Addy as Ross Cassidy
 Clare Burt as Mo Cassidy
 Duncan Pow as Dr. James Haslam
 Emma Stansfield as Nurse Emma Black
 Shereen Martin as Dr. Rebecca Jenner
 Jonathan Slinger as Prof. Tim Atkins
 Andrew Brooke as Alistair Cunningham
 Chris Wilson as Police Officer
 Kimberley Nixon as Hannah Mitchell
 Michael Shaeffer as Stephen Kemp
 Remy Beasley as Georgia
 Sophia Ally as Gracie Sturgess
 Judah Cousin as Toby Daszkiewicz
 Stephanie Gil as Ellie Bailey 
 Kiera Thompson as Annie Bailey

Episodes

Reception
Writing in The Guardian, Lucy Mangan praised the show's script and direction as being "admirably restrained", and compared the calm actions of its characters facing a "new normal" to the reactions of the public during the COVID-19 pandemic.

Release and distribution 
Worldwide distribution is handled by Fremantle. In June 2020 it was announced that AMC signed an agreement with Fremantle to exclusively broadcast the show in the United States. The AMC broadcast is slated to premiere 25 January 2021.

The series was shown over four nights on SBS TV in Australia from 24 August 2020.

In December 2021 the series was re-released on Netflix and Disney Plus

See also

 Poisoning of Sergei and Yulia Skripal

References

External links
 
 Adam Patterson – official website
 United Agents – Adam Patterson & Declan Lawn
 Dancing Ledge Productions

2020 British television series debuts
2020 British television series endings
2020s British crime drama television series
2020s British television miniseries
BBC crime drama television shows
English-language television shows
Russia–United Kingdom relations
Salisbury
Science docudramas
Toxicology in the United Kingdom
2010s in Wiltshire
Television shows set in Wiltshire